Live Bait for the Dead is a live album by Cradle of Filth, recorded at Nottingham Rock City on 14 April 2001 and released on 19 August 2002. The album was released and (uniquely, so far) distributed on the band's own Abracadaver label. The same gig is included on the DVD Heavy, Left-Handed and Candid. Following the same format as Lovecraft & Witch Hearts, the main album is supplemented by a second disc of rare tracks and remixes. This would be bassist Robin Eaglestone's final recorded appearance.

Eleven Burial Masses 

A 2007 release by Peaceville Records combines the first disc of Live Bait for the Dead with the Heavy, Left-Handed and Candid DVD (minus the bonus features). The "eleven" of the title does not take into account the instrumentals "The Ceremony Opens" and "Creatures That Kissed in Cold Mirrors".

In October 2011 it was awarded a gold certification from the Independent Music Companies Association which indicated sales of at least 75,000 copies throughout Europe.

Critical reception 

AllMusic wrote, "the performance and set list are impeccable, but it's ultimately redundant, and strictly for fans only."

Track listing 

CD ROM Extras
 Downloadable screensaver
 "No Time to Cry" (promo video)

Personnel 
 Cradle of Filth

 Dani Filth – vocals
 Paul Allender – lead guitar
 Gian Pyres – rhythm guitar
 Robin Graves – bass
 Martin Powell – keyboards
 Adrian Erlandsson – drums
 Sarah Jezebel Deva – female vocals

Charts

References

External links 

 

Cradle of Filth albums
2002 live albums